Tessa Traeger (born 1938) is a British photographer. She is known for her still life and food photography, and has worked as an advertising photographer. Her work has been published in two books of her own; included in a number of books with others on gardening and food; exhibited in both solo and group exhibitions; and is held in the collections of the National Portrait Gallery and Victoria and Albert Museum, London.

Career
Traeger studied at the Guildford School of Photography and Fine Art.

She worked on the food pages for the British Vogue magazine for sixteen years, in partnership with food writer Arabella Boxer. Some of this work is collected in their 1991 book A Visual Feast, which won the André Simon Book Award.

In the 1990s, Traeger photographed the hill farmers and their traditional methods in a remote region of south-western France, resulting in her book Voices of the Vivarais (2010).

Her 2013 exhibition, Chemistry of Light, was made by photographing decaying 19th century glass plate negatives that she had inherited.

Her 2014 book, The Calligraphy of Dance, was made as part of an artist residency at Boughton House in Northamptonshire, England.

Personal life
She was married to fellow photographer Ronald Traeger until his death from  Hodgkin's disease in 1968, aged 31.

Publications

Publications by Traeger
Voices of the Vivarais. Self-published, 2010. . With an introduction by Mark Haworth-Booth. Edition of 250 copies.
The Calligraphy of Dance. Impress, 2014. With an introduction by Liz Jobey.

Publications with contributions by Traeger
The Summer & Winter Cookbook. London: Mitchell Beazley, 1980. With Arabella Boxer.
The Vogue Summer & Winter Cookbook. London: Mitchell Beazley, 1980. . Presented as two books bound together under one cover, Vogue Summer Cookbook and Vogue Winter cookbook.
Bon Appetit Summer & Winter Cookbook. Knapp Press, 1980. .
A Visual Feast. Century, 1991. . With Arabella Boxer. A compilation of work for British Vogue from 1975 to 1991.
Ronald Traeger: New Angles. By Martin Harrison and Traeger. Munich: Schirmer Mosel, 1999. . "Published to accompany the exhibition 'Triple Exposure: three photographers from the 60s' shown in the Canon Photography Gallery at the V & A, 16 September 1999 to 30 January 2000."
A Gardener's Labyrinth: Portraits of People, Plants & Places. London: Booth-Clibborn Editions, 2003. . Photographs by Traeger and text by Patrick Kinmonth.
I am Almost Always Hungry: Seasonal Menus and Memorable Recipes. New York: Stewart, Tabori & Chang, 2003. . By Lora Zarubin. Photographs by Traeger. With a foreword by Jay McInerney.
Fern Verrow. London: Quadrille, 2015. . By Jane Scotter and Harry Astley. Photography by Traeger.
30 ingredients. London: Frances Lincoln, 2015. . By Sally Clarke. Photographed by Tessa Traeger.
Robert Kime. London: Frances Lincoln, 2015. . Text by Alastair Langlands. Photographs by Traeger, Christopher Simon Sykes, James Mortimer, and Fritz von der Schulenburg.
The Loveliest Valley: a Garden in Sussex. Bologna, Italy: Damiani, 2015. . Edited by Stewart Grimshaw. Photographs by Traeger.

Exhibitions

Solo exhibitions
Voices of the Vivarais, Purdy Hicks Gallery, London.
Chemistry of Light, Purdy Hicks Gallery, London, January–February 2013.
Tessa Traeger. The Calligraphy of Dance, January–February 2015, Purdy Hicks Gallery, London.

Exhibitions with others
Three Ways, The Photographers' Gallery, London, February–March 1978. Work by Traeger, Burt Glinn, and Hans Feurer.
A Gardener's Labyrinth, National Portrait Gallery, London, June–October 2003. Work by Traeger and Patrick Kinmonth. "50 specially commissioned portraits of Britain's leading horticulturalists."
Machine Dreams: a New Technology, The Photographers' Gallery, London, September–November 1989. Work by Traeger, David Buckland, Graham Budgett, Calum Colvin, Mike Dean, Susan Derges, Steven Dowsing, Edwina Fitzpatrick, Adrian Flowers, and David Godbold.

Award

Winner, André Simon Book Award, food category, André Simon Memorial Fund, Glasgow, UK, for the book A Visual Feast (1991) by Arabella Boxer and Traeger.

Collections
Traeger's work is held in the following permanent collections:
National Portrait Gallery, London
Victoria and Albert Museum, London

References

External links

Food and art: Tessa Traeger at BBC Two (video)
Tessa Traeger & Mark Haworth - Booth: Voices of the Vivarais: Oklahoma Museum (video)

Living people
1938 births
People from Guildford
English women photographers
Food photographers
20th-century British photographers
21st-century British photographers
Photographers from Surrey
20th-century women photographers
21st-century women photographers
20th-century English women
20th-century English people
21st-century English women
21st-century English people